Niguza anisogramma is a moth in subfamily Catocalini of family Erebidae. The species was first described by Oswald Bertram Lower in 1905. It is found in Australia.

References

External links
 Images

Catocalini
Moths described in 1905
Moths of Australia